Spiroglossa is a genus of parasitic flies in the family Tachinidae.

Species
Spiroglossa tpus Doleschall, 1858

Distribution
Maluku Islands.

References

Monotypic Brachycera genera
Diptera of Asia
Dexiinae
Tachinidae genera
Taxa named by Carl Ludwig Doleschall